Ilanga gotoi   is a species of sea snail, a marine gastropod mollusk in the family Solariellidae.

Original description
The length of the shell varies between 7 mm and 19 mm. (of Microgaza gotoi Poppe, Tagaro & Dekker, 2006) Poppe G.T., Tagaro S.P. & Dekker H. (2006) The Seguenziidae, Chilodontidae, Trochidae, Calliostomatidae and Solariellidae of the Philippine Islands. Visaya Supplement 2: 1–228. page(s): 130.

Distribution
This marine species occurs off the Philippines.

References

External links
 Worms Link
 

gotoi
Molluscs described in 2006